Conor Maguire is an Irish rugby union player, currently playing for English Premiership side Gloucester. He plays as a prop.

Early life
Maguire was born in Skerries and moved to East Meath at the age of seven. He attended Coláiste na hInse in Bettystown.

Amateur career
Prior to making his professional debut, Maguire played for a number of teams including Boyne, Old Wesley, Leinster A and Connacht Eagles, as well as age-grade rugby for Leinster and Ireland.

Professional career
Maguire made his senior professional rugby debut for Welsh side Dragons against Benetton in round 13 of the 2019-20 Pro14 on 6 March 2020, after joining on a short-term deal. The short-term deal at the Dragons was extended following rugby's restart after the COVID-19 pandemic.

On 12 February 2021, Maguire would sign for English Premiership side Gloucester as part of their elite academy squad for professional development.

On 5 August 2021, Maguire has signed a professional contract with Hartpury University to compete in the RFU Championship from the 2021-22 season.

References

External links
itsrugby.co.uk Profile
ESPN Rugby Profile

Living people
Year of birth missing (living people)
Irish rugby union players
People from Skerries, Dublin
Rugby union players from County Meath
Rugby union props
Sportspeople from Fingal
Hartpury University R.F.C. players